Xanthosine is a nucleoside derived from xanthine and ribose.  It is the biosynthetic precursor to 7-methylxanthosine by the action of 7-methylxanthosine synthase.  7-Methylxanthosine in turn is the precursor to theobromine (active alkaloid in chocolate), which in turn is the precursor to caffeine, the alkaloid in coffee and tea.

See also
 Xanthosine monophosphate
 Xanthosine diphosphate
 Xanthosine triphosphate

References

Nucleosides
Xanthines